Darko Bojanović (born 8 February 1997) is a German-born tennis player who represents Bosnia and Herzegovina.

Bojanović has a career high ATP singles ranking of 926 achieved on 17 December 2018. He also has a career high ATP doubles ranking of 831 achieved on 17 December 2018.

Bojanović represents Bosnia and Herzegovina at the Davis Cup, where he has a W/L record of 0–1.

Future and Challenger finals

Doubles 3 (1–2)

Davis Cup

Participations: (0–1)

   indicates the outcome of the Davis Cup match followed by the score, date, place of event, the zonal classification and its phase, and the court surface.

External links

1997 births
Living people
Bosnia and Herzegovina male tennis players